The 1942–43 Montreal Canadiens season was the 34th season in franchise history. The team placed fourth in the regular season to qualify for the playoffs. The Canadiens lost in the semi-finals against the Boston Bruins 4 games to 2.

Regular season
The Montreal Canadiens were still making progress, and coach Dick Irvin put together the first "Punch Line" of Elmer Lach, Toe Blake and Joe Benoit. Benoit became the first Canadien to hit the 30 goal plateau since Howie Morenz did it in 1929–30 (40 goals) scoring an even 30. Gordie Drillon also added some scoring power. Rookie  Maurice Richard showed promise, but broke his leg. The Canadiens made the playoffs by one slim point and bowed out in the playoffs' first  round. Alex Smart scored three goals in his National League Debut.

Final standings

Record vs. opponents

Schedule and results

Playoffs

SemiFinals

Player statistics

Regular season
Scoring

Goaltending

Playoffs
Scoring

Goaltending

Awards and records

Transactions

See also
 1942–43 NHL season

References
Canadiens on Hockey Database
Canadiens on NHL Reference

Montreal Canadiens seasons
Montreal
Montreal
Montreal Canadiens
Montreal Canadiens